Robinvale Storm Rugby League Football Club is an Australian rugby league football club based in Robinvale, Victoria, competing in the Sunraysia-Riverlands Rugby League.
The club won their first premiership in 2014 defeating the Mildura Warriors 20-6,  then winning back-to-back titles in 2015 defeating the Chaffey Titans 22-16, before completing their third in a row in 2016, defeating the Mildura Tigers 28-20.

See also
Rugby league in Victoria

References

External links
Robinvale Storm Fox Sports pulse

Rugby league teams in Victoria (Australia)
Rugby clubs established in 2005
2005 establishments in Australia
Rural City of Swan Hill